Laura Bussing (born 3 August 1964), is an American former International motorcycle trials championship rider. Bussing was the NATC's first Women's Trials Champion in 1998.

Biography
Bussing was born in Sequatchie, Tennessee. In 1998 the NATC added a Women's championship to the series, and Bussing took the title becoming the first official US Women's champion.

The following year she finished 5th in the championship after competing in five of the eleven rounds.

For the 2000 championship Bussing competed in and scored in all ten rounds, ending the season in a strong 4th place behind Canadian riders Christy Williams and her sister Kerry Williams, and third-place finisher Pam DeBruin. Branching out into Europe Bussing also competed in the Spanish world round.

Bussing was 6th in the 2001 NATC Women's Championship after competing in three rounds.

In 2002 she was back in the running with a string of podium finishes, she ended the season in 3rd place behind Kerry Williams and Andrea Davis. Bussing was chosen to represent the US on the women's team at the FIM Trial des Nations, this year held in Portugal. With teammates Nicole Bradford and Kerrie Brokaw, the US team finished in 7th place. Bussing competed in the FIM World round in Portugal, finishing in 17th place against the best riders in the world.

2003 was to be Bussings last season in national competition, she rode only one round in Washington, finishing 4th at the event and 11th in the series.

National Trials Championship Career

Honors
 NATC Women's Trials Champion 1998

References 

1964 births
Living people
People from Marion County, Tennessee
American motorcycle racers
Motorcycle trials riders